Robert Foster Maddox (April 4, 1870 – 1965) was the 41st Mayor of Atlanta, Georgia.

Biography
Maddox was born on April 4, 1870 to Robert Flournoy Maddox, an early Atlanta settler and war hero.

He was educated in public school, and then attended the University of Georgia until 1887 when he completed studies at Harvard University.

He was chairman of the board of the Atlanta & Lowry National Bank part of which had been founded by his father. In 1908, he served as a Fulton County commissioner and the next year he was elected Atlanta's mayor.
He had an active term, issuing the city's first large bond ($3 million) which was used for new schools, sewage disposal plants and enlarging the Atlanta Water Works.

He also had built an addition to Grady Memorial Hospital and via many trips to Washington, D.C. was able to purchase the old post office for $70,000 to be used as the City Halls of Atlanta.

During his term, the city doubled in scope: adding Oakland City among other neighborhoods.

He died in 1965.

Legacy
When Robert Maddox was in his 80s, Vernon E. Jordan Jr. served as his chauffeur.

Maddox Park in Atlanta's Bankhead neighborhood is named in his honor. The park was dedicated in 1931.
He lies in the Maddox mausoleum (with his father) in Oakland Cemetery.

Maddox Road in Morrow, Georgia is named after him, along with a Clayton County Parks and Recreation park, playground, and basketball court in Morrow, Ga.

References

External links
"American Odyssey", Newsweek, Oct 29, 2001
Stuart A. Rose Manuscript, Archives, and Rare Book Library, Emory University: Robert Foster Maddox papers, 1855-1923

1870 births
1965 deaths
Fulton County commissioners
University of Georgia alumni
Harvard University alumni
Mayors of Atlanta
Burials at Oakland Cemetery (Atlanta)